Yannick Goïcoëchea (born April 2, 1965) is a French former ice hockey forward.

Goïcoëchea played in the Ligue Magnus for Bordeaux, from 1988 to 1991 and again from 1996 to 1999. He also served as player-coach for Bordeaux between 1999 and 2001.

He played in the 1992 World Ice Hockey Championships for France.

References

External links

1965 births
Living people
Anglet Hormadi Élite players
Boxers de Bordeaux players
French ice hockey forwards